Echeveria gibbiflora is a species of flowering plant in the family Crassulaceae. It was described by Swiss botanist Augustin Pyramus de Candolle in 1828. It occurs in Mexico and Guatemala.

Description
It flowers between September and January. The dry fruits each produce approximately 200 small seeds.

Ecology
Each flower is open for between 7–8 days and is visited by nectar-seeking broad-billed hummingbirds (Cynanthus latirostris). The American bushtit (Psaltriparus minimus) has been documented foraging for aphids that occur among the flowers.

Uses
Echeveria gibbiflora has been used in Mexican folk medicine as a contraceptive, as a vaginal postcoital rinse.

Cultivars include E. gibbiflora 'Carunculata' (also spelled 'Caronculata'), E. gibbiflora 'Metallica', and E. gibbiflora 'Violescens'.

References

gibbiflora
Plants described in 1828
Flora of Mexico
Flora of Guatemala
Taxa named by Augustin Pyramus de Candolle